Ningxiang No. 1 High School, commonly abbreviated as (Ningxiang) Yizhong, is a public coeducational high school in Yutan Subdistrict of Ningxiang, Hunan, China.

History
Ningxiang No. 1 High School traces its history back to the former Old-style Private School of Zhou Family, founded by educater Zhu Jianfan in 1905, and it was renamed Zhounan Girls' School in 1907 and then Zhounan Female Normal School in the fellowing year.

In 1912, Hunan Provincial No.1 Female Normal School was founded by Zhu Jianfan. Part of the school was separated, and girls' school was established, initially called Private Zhounan School for Girls.

After the outbreak of the Second Sino-Japanese War in 1937 (and the resulting expansion of Japanese territorial control in east China), the school moved to Xiangtan, Loudi, Anhua successively. 

In 1941, Hunan Provincial No.1 Female Normal School changed its name to Hunan Provincial No. 5 High School.

After the establishment of the Communist State in 1952, the school moved back to Ningxiang and it was officially named Ningxiang No. 1 High School.

It was listed among the first group of "Hunan Provincial Key High Schools" by the Hunan Province Office of Education in 1959 and "Hunan Demonstrative High Schools" in 1994.

In 2002, the school moved to the present address.

In 2015, the school was categorized as a "Top 100 High Schools of China".

Faculty
Ningxiang No. 1 High School has a reasonable teacher's structure and abundant qualified teachers. There are 338 teachers teaching in the school, one of them is senior teacher, three are special-grade teachers and five national backbone teachers.

Achievement
With a high reputation for outstanding school running achievements, Ningxiang No.1 High School is recognized by the whole society and generate extensive social effect. In the past few years, the school has been awarded more than 10 provincial or above honorary titles, such as "National educational research and experimental school", "National key scientific research experimental school in 11th Five-Year", etc. In 2005 and 2007, the school was appraised twice as the "China top 100 middle school". In 2003, the famous scientists, the academician of the Chinese Academy of Sciences, the former vice chairman of the Standing Committee of the National People's Congress, and the former chairman of the Chinese Association of science and technology, Mr. Zhou Guangzhao, donated the gold medal of "two bombs and one star" to Ningxiang No.1 High School, encouraging the vast majority of the students to study hard and make contributions to science.

Athletics
 Weightlifting. In 2011 the school's Weightlifting Team won a gold medal and two silver medals in the Youth Weightlifting Competition in Peru. In October 2017, the school's Weightlifting Team won 11 gold medals, 11 silver medals and 3 bronze medals in the National Weightlifting Championship for High School Students.

 Track and field. In 2011 the school's Track and field Team won a silver medal and two bronze medals in the High School Track and Field Championships in Poland.

Notable alumni
 Xiang Jingyu, revolutionist.
 Zeng Xianzhi, politician.

Gallery

References

External links

Educational institutions established in 1905
High schools in Changsha
1905 establishments in China